Leo Carlsson (born 26 December 2004) is a Swedish professional ice hockey center for Örebro HK of the Swedish Hockey League (SHL). He is considered the top Swedish prospect in the 2023 NHL Entry Draft. Bob McKenzie referred to Carlsson as a "blue-chip" prospect in the 2023 draft.

Playing career
Carlsson originally played at the youth level within Färjestad BK before moving to fellow tenured SHL club, Örebro HK, for the 2020–21 season. During the 2021–22 season, Carlsson made his professional debut in the SHL as a 17 year-old, posting 3 goals and 9 points in 35 regular season games. 

In his year of drafted eligibility, Carlsson increased his stock in playing exclusively with the senior team in the SHL showing an offensive acumen in securing a scoring line role among Örebro HK for the 2022–23 season.

International play
Carlsson represented Sweden in the 2022 World Junior Championships.

Career statistics

Regular season and playoffs

International

References

External links
 

2004 births
21st-century Swedish people
Living people
Sportspeople from Karlstad
Swedish ice hockey centres
Örebro HK players